Matera is a constituency of the Uttar Pradesh Legislative Assembly covering the city of Matera in the Bahraich district of Uttar Pradesh, India.

Matera is one of five assembly constituencies in the Bahraich Lok Sabha constituency. Since 2008, this assembly constituency is numbered 284 amongst 403 constituencies.

Election results

2022

2017
Samajwadi Party candidate Yasar Shah won in 2017 Uttar Pradesh Legislative Elections defeating Bharatiya Janta Party candidate Arun Veer Singh by a margin of 1,595 votes.

2022
Samajwadi Party candidate Mariya Shah won in 2022 Uttar Pradesh Legislative Elections defeating Bharatiya Janta Party candidate Arun Veer Singh by a margin of 10,428 votes.

References

External links
 

Assembly constituencies of Uttar Pradesh
Politics of Bahraich district